Tagoloan, officially the Municipality of Tagoloan (Maranao: Inged a Tagoloan;), is a 5th class municipality in the province of Lanao del Norte, Philippines. According to the 2020 census, it has a population of 15,091 people.

History
Republic Act 5822, 21 June 1969:
The barrios of Kiasar, Darimbang, Dimayon, Inagongan, Malibato, Dalamas, and Panalawan, all of the Municipality of Baloi, Province of Lanao del Norte, are separated from said municipality and constituted into a distinct and independent municipality, to be known as the Municipality of Tagoloan, same province. The seat of government of the new municipality shall be in the poblacion of Barrio Darimbang.

Geography

Barangays
Tagoloan is politically subdivided into 7 barangays.
 Dalamas
 Darimbang
 Dimayon
 Inagongan
 Kiazar (Poblacion)
 Malimbato
 Panalawan

Climate

Demographics

Economy

Government
Mayors after People Power Revolution 1986:

Vice Mayors after People Power Revolution 1986:

References

External links
   Tagoloan Profile at the DTI Cities and Municipalities Competitive Index
 [ Philippine Standard Geographic Code]
Philippine Census Information
Local Governance Performance Management System

Municipalities of Lanao del Norte